Dr. Tamás Heintz (born February 6, 1959) is a Hungarian physician and politician, member of the National Assembly (MP) for Kaposvár (Somogy County Constituency I) between 2010 and 2014. He was also a Member of Parliament from the Fidesz Somogy County Regional List between 2006 and 2010.

He is supported by Fidesz but not member of the party itself. Heintz was a member of the Committee on Health since May 30, 2006. He functioned as deputy mayor of Kaposvár from 2005 to 2006.

Heintz became a consular secretary at the Hungarian embassy in Rome after the 2014 parliamentary election.

Personal life
He is married and has four children.

References

1959 births
Living people
Physicians from Budapest
Members of the National Assembly of Hungary (2006–2010)
Members of the National Assembly of Hungary (2010–2014)
Politicians from Budapest